D. nana may refer to:
 Dalea nana, the dwarf Prairie clover, a flowering plant species in the genus Dalea
 Diascia nana, a flowering species of Diascia (plant)

Synonyms
 Dianthoecia nana, a synonym for Hadena confusa, the marbled coronet, a moth species
 Dryandra nana, a synonym for Banksia nana, the dwarf dryandra, a shrub species endemic to Western Australia

See also
 Nana (disambiguation)